LLS may refer to:
 LanguageLine Solutions, an American on-demand and onsite language interpretation and document translation service
 The Late Late Show (Irish talk show), the world's longest-running television talk show
 Lateral line system, sense organ used by some fish and larval lissamphibians to detect movement and vibrations
 Leukemia & Lymphoma Society, charitable organization funding blood cancer research, education and patient services
 Liberal Union of Lithuania, a former political party in Lithuania
 Light Louisiana Sweet, type of crude oil
 Linear least squares
 Lithuanian Freedom Union (Liberals), a political party in Lithuania
 Longest linear sequence, a concept in synthetic chemistry
 Loyola Law School, Los Angeles, California
 Lifelong Learning Service, an online and modern learning service which main purpose is to offer specialized education unlimitless throughout new technologies (in Spanish)
 Leiden Longevity Study, an observational study

Films 

 Laal Singh Chaddha, a 2022 Indian film starring Aamir Khan.